Perry D. "Peno" Graham Field is a baseball park located in Corsicana, TX. It is the home of the Navarro College Bulldogs baseball team.

References

Baseball venues in Texas
College baseball venues in the United States